Tinto de verano (literally "summer red [wine]") is a cold, wine-based drink popular in Spain. It is similar to sangria and is typically made up of 1 part of table red wine and 1 part soda, usually lemonade. Traditional brands of soda, or gaseosa, such as La Casera, can be replicated by mixing Sprite or 7-Up with carbonated water. The drink is served over ice, often with a slice of lemon or orange.

Rum is sometimes added to the drink. Other variations include red wine mixed with lemon soda, orange soda, or bitter lemon; rosé wine mixed with lemon or orange soda; and red wine mixed with cola (known as calimocho).

The drink has its origins in the early 20th century, when Federico Vargas created a mix of a red wine and soda pop for his patrons at Venta Vargas in Cordoba, Spain. The drink was at first called un Vargas but soon came to be known as Tinto de Verano.

As the name suggests, tinto de verano is usually served during the summertime. It is often home-made, or bought ready-bottled from supermarkets. In the Costa del Sol and other Southern regions of Spain it is common for locals to drink tinto de verano as it is easy to make oneself, or has many variations of preprepared varieties for the same price as many cola drinks.  Sangria is considered more commercial and "touristy" as it requires more time to make and is often sold in restaurants at a more expensive price, whereas tinto de verano is common at parties, festivals, and dive bars where drinks are affordable and consumed in volume.

Notes and references

Cocktails with wine
Spanish wine